Santos y pecadores: Televisión x la justicia (Saints and sinners: Television for justice) was an Argentine miniseries, created by Bernarda Llorente and Claudio Villarruel, written by Guillermo Salmerón, directed by Rodolfo Cela and produced by Gonzalo Otálora. The plots focus on people damaged by bad judicial rulings. It was broadcast in 2013 by Canal 9 at a time when the regime of Cristina Fernández de Kirchner sent a controversial bill to the Congress in order to control the judiciary. The series was nominated for "Best miniseries" at the 44th Martín Fierro Awards.

References

Argentine police procedural television series
El Nueve original programming
2013 Argentine television series debuts
2014 Argentine television series endings